Trials is a racing game series developed by Ubisoft RedLynx and published by Ubisoft, loosely based on the real-life sport of motorcycle trials. It involves a motorcycle rider in a 2.5D world, traversing obstacles under the influence of simulated physics.

History
Trials was released as a browser game in 2000. The gameplay was somewhat similar to Mastertronic's 1987 hit Kikstart 2.

Trials 2 was released in 2007, and remade as Trials 2: Second Edition in 2008. Trials HD was released for the Xbox Live Arcade in 2009. Trials Evolution was released for the Xbox Live Arcade in 2012. Trials Frontier was released for smart phones and tablets on 10 April 2014.

Trials Fusion released for PlayStation 4, Xbox 360, and Xbox One on 16 April 2014. Trials Frontier and Trials Fusion are designed to work together. Trials Fusion was released for the PC on 24 April 2014.

On 11 June 2018 Trials Rising was announced by RedLynx at E3 2018. It was released for PlayStation 4, Xbox One, Nintendo Switch, and PC on 26 February 2019 and for Stadia on 19 November 2019.

Games

Main series

Other games

References

External links

Trials 2 at Miniclip
Trials Legends at Internet Archive

 
Platform games
Racing video games
Motorcycle video games
RedLynx games
Ubisoft franchises
Video game franchises
Video game franchises introduced in 2000